Carnival was released in 2005 and is the ninth studio album by British rock band, New Model Army. The album was co-produced by Chris Tsangarides and New Model Army.

It was remixed and "reimagined" in 2020, titled Carnival Redux, and features four additional tracks.

Singles and EPs
Two tracks from the album have been released as singles: "Island" (July 2005), which was available only as a digital download, and two versions of "BD3" (May 2006). An EP was also released, titled BD3 EP.

Track listing
All tracks written by Justin Sullivan and Michael Dean except where otherwise noted.
"Water" – 4:30
"BD3" – 3:30
"Prayer Flags" – 3:51
"Carlisle Road" (Sullivan) – 4:04
"Red Earth" – 5:05
"Too Close to the Sun" (Sullivan) – 4:01
"Bluebeat" – 5:00
"Another Imperial Day" – 4:51
"LS43" (Sullivan) – 3:53
"Island" – 5:24
"Fireworks Night" – 5:26

Track listing of Carnival Redux
All tracks written by Justin Sullivan and Michael Dean except where otherwise noted.
"Water"
"BD3"
"Rumour and Rapture (1650)" (Sullivan)
"Red Earth"
"LS43" (Sullivan) 
"Island"
"Carlisle Road" (Sullivan)
"One Bullet" (Sullivan)
"Bluebeat" 
"Too Close to the Sun" (Sullivan)
"Another Imperial Day"
"Prayer Flags"
"Stoned, Fired and Full of Grace" (Sullivan)
"Caslen (Christmas)" (Nice/Sullivan)
"Fireworks Night"

Personnel

Production
Chris Tsangarides – producer
New Model Army – producer

Musicians
Justin Sullivan – vocals, guitar, keyboards
Dean White – guitar
Michael Dean – drums
Nelson – bass
Dave Blomberg – guitar
Tobias Unterberg – cello on "Too Close to the Sun"
Ty Unwin – music box on "Bluebeat", strings on "Another Imperial Day"

References

discogs.com
allmusic
The Official NMA Website

New Model Army (band) albums
2005 albums
Albums produced by Chris Tsangarides